The 77th Combat Aviation Brigade is an aviation brigade of the United States Army in the Arkansas Army National Guard.  When federalized and mobilized for active service, the 77th Combat Aviation Brigade comes under the command and control of an Aviation Command.

Order of battle
The 77th Combat Aviation Brigade consists of the following units:
 Headquarters and Headquarters Company, 77th Combat Aviation Brigade AR ARNG
  1st Battalion (Security & Support), 114th Aviation Regiment

References

077
Military units and formations established in 2008